Howard Emmett Rogers (1890–1971) was an American screenwriter. He was an active anti-communist member of the Screen Writers Guild. He worked for several studios during his career. Two of his last films Calling Bulldog Drummond (1951) and The Hour of 13 (1952) were made by MGM-British.

Selected filmography

 Tin Gods (1926)
 So's Your Old Man (1926)
 Paradise for Two (1927)
 Feel My Pulse (1928)
 Gypsy of the North (1928)
 Speedy (1928)
 The Forward Pass (1929)
 The Bad One (1930)
 Dancers in the Dark (1932)
 Stepping Sisters (1932)
 The Nuisance (1933)
 Hold Your Man (1933)
 Don't Bet on Love (1933)
 The Mystery of Mr. X (1934)
 The Unguarded Hour (1936)
 Billy the Kid (1941)
 Eyes in the Night (1942)
 Assignment in Brittany (1943)
 The Adventures of Tartu (1943)
 Gambler's Choice (1944)
 Calling Bulldog Drummond (1951)
 The Hour of 13 (1952)

References

Bibliography
 Donald T. Critchlow. When Hollywood Was Right: How Movie Stars, Studio Moguls, and Big Business Remade American Politics. Cambridge University Press, 2013.

External links

1890 births
1971 deaths
20th-century American screenwriters